Louis Narens was the Graduate Director of Mathematical Behavioral Science, Professor in the Department of Cognitive Sciences and the Department of Logic and the Philosophy of Science at the University of California, Irvine.

He was one of the major exponents of measurement theory in mathematical psychology.

He passed on October 5th, 2022

Bibliography 
 Abstract Measurement Theory. (1985) The MIT Press, 
 Theories of Meaningfulness. (2002) Lawrence Erlbaum Associates, 
 Introduction to the Theories of Measurement and Meaningfulness and the Use of Invariance in Science. (2007) Lawrence Erlbaum Associates, 
 Theories of Probability: An Examination of Logical and Qualitative Foundations, (2007) World Scientific Publishing Company,

See also
American philosophy
List of American philosophers

References

External links 
 http://genealogy.math.ndsu.nodak.edu/id.php?id=48773
 https://www.imbs.uci.edu/people/faculty.php

Year of birth missing (living people)
American philosophers
American cognitive scientists
Living people
University of California, Irvine faculty
Quantitative psychologists